Atoka Historic District is a national historic district located at Atoka, Fauquier County, Virginia.  It encompasses 11 contributing buildings in the rural crossroads of Atoka.  They include four dwellings and their various outbuildings, two commercial buildings, and a stone spring house.  Notable buildings include the Caleb Rector House (c. 1830), the Atoka Store (c. 1893), and the Rector-Deane House (1893).

It was listed on the National Register of Historic Places in 2004. It is included in the Cromwell's Run Rural Historic District.

References

Historic districts in Fauquier County, Virginia
National Register of Historic Places in Fauquier County, Virginia
Historic districts on the National Register of Historic Places in Virginia